Leucogenes is a genus of plants in the family Asteraceae, native to New Zealand.

 Species
 Leucogenes grandiceps (Hook.f.) Beauverd - New Zealand 
 Leucogenes leontopodium (Hook.f.) Beauverd - New Zealand 
 Leucogenes neglecta Molloy - New Zealand 
 Leucogenes tarahaoa Molloy - New Zealand

References

Gnaphalieae
Asteraceae genera
Endemic flora of New Zealand